The Anchorage Press is a free alternative weekly newspaper based in Anchorage, Alaska and owned by Wick Communications.

Established in 1992 by Bill Boulay, Barry Bialik, and Nick Coltman as the Anchorage Bypass, it was renamed the Anchorage Press in 1994. It is published and distributed every Thursday, with a circulation of approximately 25,000. The paper was sold to Wick Communications Company in August 2006.

See also
 List of alternative weekly newspapers

External links
 

1992 establishments in Alaska
Alternative weekly newspapers published in the United States
Mass media in Anchorage, Alaska
Newspapers published in Alaska
Publications established in 1992